The Camino Nuevo Correctional Center was a women's low-security pre-release prison for incarcerated New Mexico female felons.  It was located on the grounds of the New Mexico Youth Diagnostic and Development Center, which houses the most violent youth incarcerated in the New Mexico Corrections Department, which is administered by the New Mexico Children, Youth, and Families Department (CYFD).

Camino Nuevo was administered by Corrections Corporation of America (CCA) for the New Mexico Corrections Department.

In February 2012 three former inmates of Camino Nuevo were awarded more than $3 million in damages by a federal jury, related to accusations of rape and negligent supervision on the part of CCA.

References

External links
Closure of Camino Youth Facility, May 26, 2004 Albuquerque Journal

Buildings and structures in Albuquerque, New Mexico
Prisons in New Mexico
CoreCivic
2006 establishments in New Mexico
2008 disestablishments in New Mexico